The Americas Zone was one of the three zones of the regional Davis Cup competition in 1994.

In the Americas Zone there were three different tiers, called groups, in which teams competed against each other to advance to the upper tier. Winners in Group III advanced to the Americas Zone Group II in 1995. All other teams remained in Group III.

Participating nations

Draw
 Venue: St. Lucia Racquet Club, Gros Islet, Saint Lucia
 Date: 9–13 March

Group A

Group B

1st to 4th place play-offs

5th to 8th place play-offs

Final standings

  and  promoted to Group II in 1995.

Round robin

Group A

Barbados vs. El Salvador

Costa Rica vs. Haiti

Barbados vs. Haiti

Costa Rica vs. El Salvador

Barbados vs. Costa Rica

El Salvador vs. Haiti

Group B

Bolivia vs. Eastern Caribbean

Dominican Republic vs. Trinidad and Tobago

Bolivia vs. Trinidad and Tobago

Dominican Republic vs. Eastern Caribbean

Bolivia vs. Dominican Republic

Eastern Caribbean vs. Trinidad and Tobago

1st to 4th place play-offs

Semifinals

Dominican Republic vs. Haiti

Bolivia vs. El Salvador

Final

Bolivia vs. Haiti

3rd to 4th play-off

Dominican Republic vs. El Salvador

5th to 8th place play-offs

5th to 8th play-offs

Costa Rica vs. Eastern Caribbean

Barbados vs. Trinidad and Tobago

5th to 6th play-offs

Costa Rica vs. Trinidad and Tobago

7th to 8th play-offs

Barbados vs. Eastern Caribbean

References

External links
Davis Cup official website

Davis Cup Americas Zone
Americas Zone Group III